The 17th Ice Hockey World Championships and 28th European Championships were held from 13 to 22 March 1950 in London, England.  Canada, represented by the Edmonton Mercurys, won its 13th World Championship. Highest ranking European team Switzerland finished third, winning its fourth European Championship. Defending World and European champion Czechoslovakia was absent from the tournament.

History and political issues
Officially, the defending champion Czechoslovaks did not arrive in London because two of their journalists did not receive their visas.  In reality, communist authorities had become uneasy after the LTC Praha (LTC Prague) club team had suffered defections at the 1948 Spengler Cup in Davos, the death of six national team players in a plane crash a few months before the 1949 World Ice Hockey Championships, and the defection of former national hockey team player (and future Wimbledon tennis champion) Jaroslav Drobný in June 1949.  The authorities arrested several members of the 1950 national team while they were awaiting their delayed flight at the Prague Airport.  On 7 October 1950, the players appeared in court charged with espionage and were named "state traitors."  At issue was the claim that several players on the 1950 national team, who played their club hockey with LTC Praha, had discussed defecting in Davos in 1948—though only Miroslav Sláma, two other players and one of the heads of the delegation had actually defected at that Spengler Cup tournament.  All twelve men were convicted, with sentences ranging from eight months to 15 years. Then current LTC Praha and former national team goaltender Bohumil Modrý, a delegate with the 1950 national team, was the one to receive the 15 year sentence, as he was mysteriously cast as the "main figure" in the potential defection plan.

Despite the politics, International Ice Hockey Federation president W. G. Hardy stressed that the event was "to promote international amity". Hardy credited the Sweden men's national ice hockey team for great improvements reflecting the growth of the game in Sweden.

World Hockey Championships (in London, England) 
In a format similar to the 1949 championships, in the initial round, the nine teams participating were divided into three groups with three teams each.  In the second round, the top two teams in each group advanced to the medal pool (for positions 1 through 6) with the remaining three teams advancing to the consolation pool for places 7 through 9.

First Round

Group A 

Standings

Group B 

Standings

Group C 

Standings

Consolation round – places 7 to 9 

Standings

Final Round – places 1 to 6 

Standings

Note: While the U.S. team technically placed second, Switzerland as the European Champion received the Silver Medal. The U.S. team received the Bronze medal for their second-place finish.

Final rankings – World Championship 

World Champion 1950
 Canada

Team members
Edmonton Mercurys

Final rankings – European Championships 

European Champions 1950
 Switzerland

Citations

References
Complete results

O'Coughlin, Seamus (2001). Squaw Valley Gold:  American Hockey's Olympic Odessey.  Writer's Showcase. pp. 148.

IIHF Men's World Ice Hockey Championships
International ice hockey competitions hosted by the United Kingdom
Ice Hockey World Championships
International sports competitions in London
Ice Hockey World Championships
1949–50 in British ice hockey